The 2014 Champions Tennis League was the first edition of the Champions Tennis League.

Format
In 2014, the CTL saw 13 matches played over a 10-day period between 17 and 26 November 2014. Each tie consisted of 5 sets, with each considered as a match. The winner of a match was the player/doubles team that won 6 games. The winner of the tie was the team that won the highest number of games across all 5 sets. The winners' prize money was Rs. 1 crore, while the runner-up prize was Rs. 50 lakhs.

Teams

Players

Mumbai Tennis Masters

Delhi Dreams

Pune Marathas

Bangalore Raptors

 Hyderabad Aces

Punjab Marshalls

Group round

Matches

Standings
 North Zone: Delhi – 3 points, Mumbai – 2 points, Punjab – 1 point.
 South Zone: Pune – 4 points, Hyderabad – 2 points, Bangalore – 0 points.

Final

References

Champions Tennis League
Champions Tennis League
Champions Tennis League
Champions Tennis League